The 1966 Duke Blue Devils football team represented Duke University during the 1966 NCAA University Division football season.

Schedule

Roster

References

Duke
Duke Blue Devils football seasons
Duke Blue Devils football